Lotty Ipinza Rincón (born 9 April 1953, Valencia, Venezuela) is a poet and lyric singer.

She studied music at the Juan José Landaeta Music School (in Caracas), the National Conservatory of the National University (in Bogotá), the Tchaikovsky Conservatory (in Moscow) and the Santa Cecilia Conservatory (in Rome). In Paris, she frequented the Institute of Recherche and Coordination Acoustique/Musique IRCAM. She studied in a self-taught way Philosophy and Literature.

She inaugurated Teatro Teresa Carreño of Caracas with opera  Aída , of Verdi. She has performed concerts and recitals in Europe and America. She has sung opera, oratorios, lied er, Latin American songs and contemporary music, especially from Kurt Weill. She directs her singing school with multidisciplinary and avant-garde concepts.

Her style has a dramatic-spinto soprano voice of dark color, dense and bright, generous squillo. Her interpretation is captivating, challenging, generous and overflowing.

In 1990 she founded with the Venezuelan soprano Fedora Alemán in Caracas the Taller de Técnica Vocal Fedora Alemán, initially aimed at aspiring lyric singers, with limited economic resources and currently to stimulate the participation of those young people attracted by the singing of which is currently manager.

She has published aphorisms in the magazine  Imagen , poetry in the  Literary Paper  of the newspaper  El Nacional  and participated in the First World Poetry Festival 2004 and in the VIII World Festival of Poetry 2011  in Caracas. She has also participated in poetic recitals.

References

1953 births
Living people
Venezuelan women poets
Venezuelan operatic sopranos
20th-century women opera singers
20th-century Venezuelan poets
21st-century women opera singers
21st-century Venezuelan poets
People from Valencia, Venezuela
21st-century Venezuelan women writers